Raj Kumar Lekhi was once the head of the Tharu Kalyankari Society and chairman of the Nepal Federation of Indigenous Nationalities (NEFIN).

References

External links
 Rajkumar Lekhi

Nepalese activists
Living people
Year of birth missing (living people)